La Mata is one of 28 parishes (administrative divisions) in the municipality of Grado, within the province and autonomous community of Asturias, in northern Spain. 

The population is 557 (INE 2007).

Villages and hamlets
 Alcubiella
 La Cai
 Campo del Valle
 El Carbayín
 Las Corradas
 Cueto
 Entre la Fuente
 Entre la Iglesia
 Entre los Ríos
 La Espina
 La Espriella
 Las Ferreras
 Infiesta
 Javier
 Los Llanos
 Llantrales
 El Merín
 Picalgallo
 Pozanco
 Prioto
 Rebollal
 Reguero
 El Rellán
 Ribiellas
 Rodaco
 San Pelayo
 Santo Dolfo
 Sobrevega
 El Xorro
 La Zurraquera

References

Parishes in Grado